Ho Wang Lee (26 October 1928 – 5 July 2022) was a South Korean physician, epidemiologist, and virologist. He was the first person in the history of medicine to be the one chiefly responsible for all 3 of the following steps: (1) discovery of the virus causing a human disease, (2) development of a method of diagnosis for the disease, and (3) development of a vaccine against the disease.

Biography
Lee was born in Sinhung, South Hamgyong Province, Korea on 26 October 1928. He studied medicine at Seoul National University with an M.D. degree in 1954 and was awarded a doctorate at the University of Minnesota in 1959. From 1954 to 1972 he was a professor of microbiology at the Medical College of Seoul National University, as well as dean of the Medical College. From 1972 to 1994 he was the director of the Department of Virology of Korea University. From 1994 to his death he was the director of the ASAN Institute for Life Sciences in South Korea.

In 1976 Lee and his collaborators succeeded in isolating the virus causing Korean hemorrhagic fever; they gave it the name Hantaan virus (now called hantavirus or orthohantavirus). The discovery caused a sensation in the international community of medical researchers, because the quest for isolating the virus had been the subject of intense effort since the early 1950s. The research involved in isolating the virus was dangerous, and several of Lee's collaborators became ill due to aerosols produced by chronically infected rodents.

In 1989 Lee and collaborators developed a formalin-inactivated suckling mouse Hantaan virus vaccine, which under the name Hantavax™ has been approved for commercial use in South Korea since 1990. In 1990 Tomiyama and Lee published their findings for their method of rapid serodiagnosis of hantavirus infections.

Ho Wang Lee became one of the first South Korean scientists to gain international fame while continuing to do research primarily in South Korea.

Awards and honors
 1981 — Member of the Korean National Academy of Sciences
 1981 — Director of the WHO Collaborating Center for Virus Reference and  Research
 1987 — President of the International Conference on Hemorrhagic Fever with Renal Syndrome
 1989 — Korea Science Award
 1992 — Ho-Am Prize
 1994 — Prince Mahidol Award
1998 — International member of the American Philosophical Society
 2002 — Foreign member of the United States National Academy of Sciences
 2004 — Foreign honorary member of the American Academy of Arts and Sciences

References

External links
 Lee Ho-wang's biography on the National Archives of Korea Web site (Korean)

1928 births
2022 deaths
20th-century South Korean physicians
21st-century South Korean physicians
South Korean epidemiologists
South Korean virologists
Seoul National University alumni
University of Minnesota alumni
Academic staff of Seoul National University
Academic staff of Korea University
People from South Hamgyong
Foreign associates of the National Academy of Sciences
Members of the American Philosophical Society
Recipients of the Ho-Am Prize in Medicine
Members of the National Academy of Sciences of the Republic of Korea